Chan Kin Seng (born 19 March 1985) is a Macanese international football striker who currently plays for Monte Carlo of the Macau 1st Division Football. He also has played for the Macau national team in the 2006 AFC Challenge Cup, 2006 Lusophony Games and scored both goals for Macau in their 2-13 aggregate 2010 FIFA World Cup qualification match loss to Thailand.

International goals
Scores and results list Macau's goal tally first.

References

External links
EAFF profile

1985 births
Living people
Macau footballers
Macau international footballers
C.D. Monte Carlo players
Windsor Arch Ka I players
Association football forwards
Footballers at the 2006 Asian Games
Asian Games competitors for Macau
Liga de Elite players